Wham-O Inc. is an American toy company based in Carson, California, United States. It is known for creating and marketing many popular toys for nearly 70 years, including the  Hula hoop, Frisbee, Slip 'N Slide, Super Ball, Trac-Ball, Silly String, Hacky sack, Wham-O Bird Ornithopter and Boogie Board, many of which have become genericized trademarks.

Corporate history
Richard Knerr (1925–2008) and Arthur "Spud" Melin (1924–2002), two University of Southern California graduates who were friends since their teens, were unhappy with their jobs and decided to start their own business. In 1948 they formed the WHAM-O Manufacturing Company in the Knerr family garage in South Pasadena. Their first product was the Wham-O Slingshot, made of ash wood, which Knerr and Melin promoted by holding demonstrations of their own slingshot skills. The name "Wham-O" was inspired by the sound of the slingshot's shot hitting the target. The powerful slingshot was adopted by clubs for competitive target shooting and small game hunting. When they outgrew the garage, Knerr and Melin rented a building on S. Marengo Ave in Alhambra, California; and then, in 1955, moved their manufacturing plant to neighboring San Gabriel, California where they remained until 1987, when they sold the plant to Huy Fong Foods.

Products and marketing

In 1957, Wham-O, still a fledgling company, took the idea of Australian bamboo "exercise hoops", manufactured them in Marlex, and called their new product the Hula Hoop. (The name had been used since the 18th century, but till then was not registered as a trademark.) It became the biggest toy fad in modern history. 25 million were sold in four months, and in two years sales reached more than 100 million. "Hula Hoop mania" continued through the end of 1959, and netted Wham-O $45 million (equivalent to $ in ).

Shortly thereafter, the company had another huge success with the Frisbee. In 1955 inventor Fred Morrison began marketing a plastic flying disc called the Pluto Platter. He sold the design to Wham-O in 1957. In 1959 Wham-O marketed a slightly modified version, which they had renamed the "Frisbee" two years earlier in 1957 - and once again a Wham-O toy became a common part of life through the 1960s.

In the early 1960s Wham-O created the Super Ball, a high-bouncing ball made of a hard elastomer Polybutadiene alloy, dubbed Zectron, with a 0.92 coefficient of restitution when bounced on hard surfaces. Around 20 million Super Balls were sold that decade, and the NFL named the Super Bowl games after it.

The Frisbee and Hula Hoop created fads. With other products, Wham-O tried to capitalize on existing national trends. In the 1960s they produced a US$119 do-it-yourself bomb shelter cover. In 1962, they sold a limbo dance kit to take advantage of that fad; and in 1975, when the movie Jaws was released, they sold plastic shark teeth.

Many products were not successful. During an African safari in the early 1960s, Melin discovered a species of fish that laid eggs in the mud during Africa's dry season. When the rains came, the eggs hatched and fish emerged overnight. This inspired Melin to create the  product, an aquarium kit consisting of some of the fish eggs, and some mud in which to hatch them.

Other products

 Wham-O Bird Ornithopter (1959) sold in a large cardboard box, ready to fly. Made of aluminum spars, wood, steel wire and mylar, it was brightly painted to resemble a hawk or owl. The retail price for the rubber-band-powered toy was $3 (about $24 in 2020 money). About 600,000 were made.
Wheelie Bar (1966) for wheelie bikes, especially well suited for the popular Schwinn Sting-Ray. The packaging design, featuring 1960s icon Rat Fink, was widely reproduced on T-shirts, posters and decals. The television commercial featured Kathryn Minner, the original Little Old Lady from Pasadena.
 Air Blaster (1965), which shot a puff of air that could blow out a candle at 20 feet
 Bubble Thing (1988), a flexible plastic strip attached to a wand, which was dipped in soap solution and waved through the air to create giant soap bubbles. Ads claimed it could make bubbles "as long as a bus".
 Huf'n Puf blowgun that shot soft rubber darts
 Real (non-toy) crossbows, machetes, boomerangs and throwing knives
 Powermaster .22 caliber single-shot target pistol, sold by mail order (1956), and several other .22 caliber weapons
 Slip 'N Slide (1961), a carpet-like, water-lubricated sliding surface
 Water Wiggle (1962), a plastic-enclosed curved nozzle that, when powered by a garden hose, became airborne. Recalled in 1978 after it caused the deaths of two children, having sold approximately 2.5 million units.
 Monster Magnet (1964)
 Super Sneaky Squirtin' Stick (1964)
 Willie (1964), a furry toy snake
 Super Stuff (1966)
 Giant Comics (1967)
 Silly String (1969)
 Super Elastic Bubble Plastic (1970)
 Magic Window (1971), two  oval plates of heavy clear plastic, with a narrow channel between them containing "microdium" (glass) crystal sands of varying colors that created complex patterns when shifted.)
 Trac-Ball
 Magic sand (1980), sand coated with a hydrophobic material that caused water to bead off of it rather than being absorbed
 Roller Racer Sit Skate (1983)
 Hacky Sack, a footbag design purchased from its inventors in 1983
 Splatter Up (1990s)
 EZ SPIN Foam Frisbee Disc (2008), a soft version of the Frisbee that could be used indoors
 Morey Bodyboarding#Prone Tom Morey
 BZ Pro Boards
 Churchill Swimfins
 Smacircle, the world's smallest, lightest e-bike that fits into a backpack
 Wham-O Frisbee Sonic

Strategy
Wham-O's initial success was a result of its founders' insight. Knerr and Melin marketed their products directly to kids, including demonstrating their toys at playgrounds. They extensively researched new product ideas, including traveling around the world. “If Spud and I had to say what we contributed,” Knerr said, “it was fun.  But I think this country gave us more than we gave it. It gave us the opportunity to do it."

For many years, the company's strategy was to maintain eight to twelve simple, inexpensive products such as Frisbees, Super Balls, and Hula Hoops. New products were developed for tryout periods. Old ones were retired, for a few years or permanently, as their popularity waned. Since the toys were simple and inexpensive, they could be sold by a wide range of retailers, from large Department Stores to five and dime stores.

As Wham-O changed ownership, its new management adjusted this formula to accommodate the changing toy industry, which had increasingly complex toys and fewer distribution channels.

By 2006 Wham-O's product line included several groups of related items using licensed brand names. For example, Sea-Doo is a brand of personal water craft owned by Bombardier; Wham-O makes a Sea-Doo line of small inflatable rafts designed to be towed behind watercraft.

The company's lines are also more complex, and grouped in related categories—for example, the Sea-Doo line (about a dozen products), several Slip 'N Slide variations, and a group of "lawn games".

On January 31, 2011, Wham-O announced an agreement with ICM, the agency representing Atari video games, to represent Wham-O in movies, television, music, and online content based around its toys.

Company timeline

 1948: WHAM-O founded. For about a year in the 1950s, the company markets their sporting goods under the name WAMO.
 1957: WHAM-O acquires the rights to the Pluto Platter from Fred Morrison and renames it Frisbee.
 1958: Hula Hoop introduced
 1958: Frisbee sales improve
 1961: Slip 'N' Slide introduced
 1965: Super Ball introduced
 1982: Wham-O purchased by Kransco Group Companies
 1994: Mattel buys Wham-O from Kransco
 1995: Wham-O buys Aspectus.
 1997: Wham-O becomes independent again when an investment group purchases it from Mattel
 2002: Founder Arthur "Spud" Melin dies
 January 2006: Wham-O is sold for ~ US$80 million to Cornerstone Overseas Investment Limited, a Chinese company that owns or controls five factories in China. The same month, Wham-O donated the office files, photographs and films of Dan "Stork" Roddick, Wham-O's director of sports promotion from 1975 to 1994, to the Western Historical Manuscript Collection.
 2008: Founder Richard Knerr dies
 2008: Wham-O introduces the EZ Spin Foam Frisbee Disc, a soft foam version of the Frisbee
 2009: Wham-O sold to investment firm The Aguilar Group
 2010: Wham-O acquires Sprig Toys Inc.
 2015: StallionSport Ltd. and InterSport Corp. acquire global rights to Wham-O Inc.
 2018: Wham-O partners with Smacircle LMT ltd. to introduce Smacircle S1, an e-bike.

References

External links
Wham-O Company website
Flying Disc Time-Line
Ken Westerfield – history of Frisbee and disc sports.

Toy companies of the United States
Manufacturing companies based in Greater Los Angeles
Companies based in Los Angeles County, California
Carson, California
American companies established in 1948
Toy companies established in 1948
1948 establishments in California
Privately held companies based in California